The Heart of a Child is a lost 1920 silent film drama directed by Ray Smallwood with Alla Nazimova as star. It was scripted by Charles Bryant, Nazimova's husband and co-star. Metro Pictures distributed.

Cast
Alla Nazimova - Sally Snape
Charles Bryant - Lord Kidderminster
Ray Thompson - Johnny Doone
Nell Newman - Mary Murray
Victor Potel - Charley Peastone
Eugene Klum - Alf Stevens
Claire DuBrey - Lady Dorothea
Jane Sterling - Lady Fortive
William Irving - Perry
Myrtle Rishell - Miss Blaine
Joseph Kilgour - Lord Fortive
Rafael Icardo - Bit role

References

External links

 Moving Picture World cover

1920 films
American silent feature films
Lost American films
American black-and-white films
Silent American drama films
1920 drama films
Metro Pictures films
1920 lost films
Lost drama films
Films directed by Ray Smallwood
1920s American films